is a Japanese illustrator and animator.

Biography
An anime fan, Inomata began working for Ashi Productions, working as an animator, key animation director and character designer on several anime television series.

In 1982, she left the staff of Ashi Productions, and joined Kaname Productions, working as an animator, animation director and character designer on several of its series. In 1983, she also made her debut as a manga artist, with her work GB Bomber being featured in Tokuma Shoten's The Motion Comic. Later, in 1984, she left Kaname Productions and continued her work as a freelance animator.

Inomata is noted for her work as an animator, character designer and animation director on several anime titles, including Windaria, Plawres Sanshirō, Future GPX Cyber Formula, and Brain Powerd.

Inomata is also a prolific novel illustrator, known for her vivid watercolor paintings which often center around young women with wide, jewel-like eyes. Many of her illustrations are collected in her artbooks, which include Voice of the Stars, Dreams of the Moon (星の聲月の夢), Eccelente, SAI, and numerous others. Her representative works as a novel illustrator are for the Utsunomiko (宇宙皇子) series written by Keisuke Fujikawa (藤川圭介) and Weathering Continent (風の大陸) series by author Sei Takegawa (竹河聖). She is also noted for being the main character designer on a number of titles in Namco's Tales of series of video games.

Works

Manga
GB Bomber (Motion Comics)
Nyan no Ohanashi (Anime Juke Mix) - based on her love for cats.

Artbooks
 Inomata Mutsumi Lovely Collection
 Inomata Mutsumi Art Collection - Utsunomiko (いのまたむつみ画集 宇宙皇子)
 Voice of the Stars, Dreams of the Moon (星の聲月の夢)
 Utsunomiko 2 (宇宙皇子２)
 Mikan Story (みかんＳＴＯＲＹ)
 Dragon Quest
 Eccellente
 SAI (彩)
 Tales
 Un Ballo En Maschera, The Weathering Continent

Anime
 Kujira no Josefina (animation)
 Zukkoke Knight Don De La Mancha (animation)
 Space Warrior Baldios (animation)
 Gekijōban Uchū Senshi Baldios (key animation)
 Sengoku Majin GoShōgun (animation director, key animation)
 Sasuga no Sarutobi (animation director, key animation)
 Leda: The Fantastic Adventure of Yohko (character designs, animation director (ep.1))
 Windaria (character designs, animation director)
 Acrobunch (character designs, animation director)
 Plawres Sanshiro (character designs, animation director)
 Urusei Yatsura (key animation)
 City Hunter (animation director)
 City Hunter 2 (animation director)
 Utsunomiko (original character design)
 The Weathering Continent (original character design)
 Watt Poe to Bokura no Ohanashi (character design)
 Magical Princess Minky Momo (key animation)
 Future GPX Cyber Formula (original character design)
 Brain Powerd (original character design)
 Mobile Suit Gundam SEED (design coordinator)
 My-HiME (original seifuku (school uniform) design)
 Mobile Suit Gundam SEED Destiny (design coordinator)
 Sacred Seven (original character design)

Games
Alpha (Square)
Dungeon of Windaria (Nintendo DS, Compile Heart; original character design)
EMIT (PC game)
Surging Aura
Yami no Matsuei (Sega Saturn game)
Tales series (Bandai Namco Games)
Tales of Destiny
Tales of Eternia
Tales of Destiny 2
Tales of Rebirth
Tales of the Tempest
Tales of Innocence
Tales of Hearts
Tales of Graces
Tales of Xillia
Tales of Xillia 2
Tales of Zestiria
Tales of Berseria
Tekken series (Bandai Namco Games)
Tekken 5 (PlayStation 2; Ling Xiaoyu and Jin Kazama's third costume designs)
Tekken 6 (PlayStation 3, Xbox 360 PlayStation Portable; Zafina's third costume design)
Tekken Tag Tournament 2 (PlayStation 3, Xbox 360, Wii U; Jaycee's second costume design)
BB Ball

Tokusatsu
Dennō Keisatsu Cyber Cop (Luna design)

Note

External links 
  
 Inomata's profile on her print publisher's site
 

Japanese animators
Anime character designers
1960 births
People from Kanagawa Prefecture
Living people
Video game artists